The Cornell University Chorus was founded in 1920, initially as the Cornell Women's Glee Club. The Chorus is a sixty-member treble choir, with repertoire including masses, motets, spirituals, classical, folk, 20th-century music, and traditional Cornell songs. Aside from its constantly changing and increasing selection of choral music for treble voices, the Chorus also performs major works with the Cornell University Glee Club such as Beethoven's Missa Solemnis, Handel's Messiah, and Bach's Mass in B Minor and St Matthew Passion .

The Chorus performs annually during Convocation, First-Year Parents Weekend, Homecoming, Senior Week, Commencement, and Reunion Weekend. In addition to the concerts on campus, the Chorus also has experience in professional settings, working under the baton of Nadia Boulanger, Eugene Ormandy, Erich Leinsdorf, Michael Tilson Thomas, Julius Rudel, and Karel Husa on the stages of Carnegie Hall, Lincoln Center, the Kennedy Center, the Philadelphia Academy of Music, and the Saratoga Performing Arts Center. The Chorus has also been featured on two nationwide broadcasts: a special half hour on CBS radio, and an appearance on PBS's MacNeil/Lehrer News Hour as part of an artistic feature on former director Susan Davenny Wyner. The Chorus has collaborated with world musician Samite of Uganda, participated in a production of Richard Einhorn's Voices of Light with Anonymous 4, and performed several major works with the Syracuse Symphony Orchestra, including Bach's Mass in B Minor, Beethoven's Symphony No. 9, and Lili Boulanger's Du fond de l'abîme with the Cornell Symphony Orchestra.

Commissioning Project
In 2003, the Cornell University Chorus launched a commissioning project known informally as "No Whining, No Flowers." The goal of the project is to expand the contemporary repertoire for treble choirs by commissioning pieces from women composers using text from women writers. Furthermore, these texts are intended to explore topics that differ from the traditional treble repertoire themes of lost love and scenery admiration - hence the title of the project. Commissioning projects to date include:

Elizabeth Alexander: Why I Pity the Woman Who Never Spills (2003)
Sally Lamb: The Sadness of the Sea (2004)
Edie Hill: A Voice (2005)
Carol E. Barnett: Song of Perfect Propriety (2006)
Augusta Read Thomas: Juggler of Day (2007)
Abbie Betinis: Chant for Great Compassion (2008)
Libby Larsen: A Book of Spells (2009)
David Conte: To Music (2010) (Special commission in honor of Chorus alumna Heather Walters, '81, who died on August 27, 2009)
Sally Lamb: Voices of the Hills (2011)
Kay Rhie: Kassia's Hymn (2012)
Flannery Cunningham: Onion Days (2013)
Lisa Bielawa: Songs from Ort (2014)
Mia Makaroff: Jump the Chromosome and Perception Test (2016)
Christine Donkin: The Grail Bird (2017)
Melissa Dunphy: It Isn't a Dream (2018)
Hanne Bæverfjord: It Comes Unadorned (2019)

Domestic and International Tours

1998 - Taiwan
1999 - Midwest
2000 - Canada
2001 - Venezuela (with the Cornell University Glee Club)
2003 - Mid-Atlantic
2004 - Great Lakes
2005 - Italy
2008 - China (with the Cornell University Glee Club)
2012 - Oklahoma, Texas, and Louisiana
2013 - New England
2014 - Midwest
2015 - California
2016 - Mexico and Guatemala (with the Cornell University Glee Club)
2017 - Southeastern United States
2018 - Gulf Coast
2019 - Canada and Boston
2020 - Pacific Northwest (with the Cornell University Glee Club)

In addition to these extended trips, the Chorus also travels to other universities for competitions and festivals. In the past, they have performed at Harvard for the Centennial Celebration of the Radcliffe Choral Society as well as joint concerts with the Toronto Women's Chorus, the Penn State Glee Club, and the Wellesley Chorus.

Directors

1920–1942: Lillian (Mrs.Eric Sydney) Dudley
1942–1945: John Marinus Kuypers
1945–1946: Paul John Weaver
1946-1947: Mrs. Don Price
1947-1951: Mrs. F. Clinton White
1951–1957: Thomas Brodhead Tracy
1957–1958: Thomas Andrew Sokol
1958-1960: James F. Armstrong (When Armstrong left to return to Harvard in 1960, the Women's Glee Club was disbanded, and replaced by the Cornell Chorus, under the direction of Thomas Sokol.)
1960-1963: Thomas Andrew Sokol
1963-1964: William C. Holmes (acting director)
1964-1965: Thomas Andrew Sokol
1965-1966: Thomas Andrew Sokol (Fall); William C. Holmes (Acting Director - Spring)
1966-1970: Thomas Andrew Sokol
1970-1971: David Buttolph (Fall): Thomas Andrew Sokol (Spring)
1971-1974: Thomas Andrew Sokol
1974-1975: Donna Bloom
1975-1983: Thomas Andrew Sokol
1983- 1984: Thomas Andrew Sokol (Fall); Byron Adams (Acting Director -Spring)
1984-1985:  Thomas Andrew Sokol
1985-1986: Byron Adams (acting director)
1986-1987:  Thomas Andrew Sokol
1987-1991: Susan Davenny Wyner
1991-1995: Ron Schiller
1995–2012: Scott Arthur Tucker
2012–2013: John Rowehl
2013–2020: Robert Isaacs
2021–Present: Sarah Bowe

A Cappella Subsets

After Eight (1991-present)
After Eight, formed in 1991, is the official a cappella subset of the Cornell University Chorus. After Eight regularly performs contemporary repertoire arranged for a cappella by current members and alumnae of the group. They additionally perform selections from the Chorus repertoire on occasion, as well as traditional Cornell songs. After Eight has two major on-campus concerts every semester, one in the Fall (Witching Hour) and one in the Spring (Evening Affair). They also perform around campus at student and alumni events throughout the year.

Earlier subset history 
Nothing But Treble (1976-1990) formed as a subset of the Chorus in 1976. In 1990, the group disassociated from the Chorus. They are still an active a cappella group on campus.

See also
Cornell University Glee Club
List of Cornell Songs

External links
Cornell University Chorus Official Website
Chorus Facebook
Chorus Instagram
Chorus Twitter
Chorus YouTube
Chorus Spotify
After Eight A Cappella

References 

Choirs in New York (state)
Chorus
Cornell University
Musical groups established in 1920
1921 establishments in New York (state)